Eastern Armenia ( Arevelyan Hayastan) comprises the eastern part of the Armenian Highlands, the traditional homeland of the Armenian people. Between the 4th and the 20th centuries, Armenia was partitioned several times, and the terms Eastern and Western Armenia have been used to refer to its respective parts under foreign occupation or control, although there has not been a defined line between the two. The term has been used to refer to: 
Persian Armenia (a vassal state of the Persian Empire from 387, fully annexed in 428) after the country's partition between the Byzantine and Sassanian empires and lasted until the Arab conquest of Armenia in the mid-7th century.
Iranian Armenia (1502–1813/1828), which covered the period of Eastern Armenia during the early-modern and late-modern era when it was part of the various Iranian empires, up to its annexation by the Russian Empire (1813 and 1828).
Russian Armenia (1828 to 1917) and Soviet Armenia (1920 to 1991), which covered the Armenian populated areas under the control of the Russian Empire and the Soviet Union, respectively, and currently exists as the Republic of Armenia.

References

Former regions of Armenia
Political terminology